Cloak & Dagger is a 1984 American spy adventure film directed by Richard Franklin, and starring Henry Thomas, Dabney Coleman, and Michael Murphy. It was written by Tom Holland and based on a Cornell Woolrich short story, "The Boy Cried Murder", which had been filmed as The Window (1949). It was originally released in a double feature with The Last Starfighter on July 13, 1984, and was released separately on August 10, 1984. The film grossed $9.7 million in the United States. Thomas was nominated for the Young Artist Award for Best Actor.

Plot
Davey Osborne is an 11-year-old boy living in San Antonio, Texas. His father, Hal, is a military air traffic controller, who has problems relating to his son. Davey imagines the fantasy world of Cloak & Dagger, an espionage role-playing video game existing between fiction and reality. Davey befriends Kim Gardener, a girl living nearby. Davey reveres Jack Flack, the game's main character, who he imagines as a more dashing version of his father. He wants to live an action-packed life like Jack, and he carries around a water pistol as his "gun" and a softball as his "grenade". Davey spends much time playing the game and spending time with Jack as an imaginary friend.

One day, Davey's friend, Morris, who owns a game shop, sends Davey and Kim on an errand, where Davey witnesses a murder. Before the victim dies, he gives Davey a Cloak & Dagger video game cartridge containing important military secrets that must be given to the FBI. Davey seeks help from the authorities, who disbelieve him.

Spies, led by the nefarious Dr. Rice, murder Morris and then chase Davey across the city. Along the way, Jack helps Davey evade the pursuers. However, Davey's sense of morality and concern for his friend Kim (whom the spies have kidnapped to try and blackmail Davey into handing over the cartridge) collide with Jack's harsh methods. Davey is cornered by the spies along the River Walk. During the fight, Jack urges Davey to lure two of the spies into the "Crossfire Gambit", causing one to kill the other. Jack convinces Davey to pick up the gun of a dead spy, but rather than shoot Rice, Davey panics and runs away down a dead-end path. Rice arrives and corners Davey, taunting him. When Davey proves unwilling to shoot first, Jack tries to get Rice's attention. Standing in front of a blank wall (and holding his Agent-X bulletproof beret in front of him for protection), Jack dares Rice to shoot him. Davey looks to Jack, warning him not to do anything, and Rice instinctively turns and fires at the wall, thinking "Jack" is a hidden ally. Enraged, Davey fires his pistol, killing Rice.

Realizing that Jack had tricked him into shooting the spy, Davey discards the pistol, pulls the miniature of Jack out of his pocket and breaks it on the concrete. Blood begins to pour from the bullet holes that now riddle Jack's body, and he collapses. While expressing regret about the rule, "...leaving when they stop believing", Jack confesses Davey was always his favorite playmate. Distracting Davey by asking for a smoke, Jack fades and vanishes. When Davey calls to Jack, saying he can't do it alone, Jack's voice reassures him that he always could, and tells him to save Kim.

Earlier, Davey had been befriended by an elderly couple but they turn out to be enforcers allied with the spies. Davey escapes them, but without the game cartridge, and he chases the couple to the airport where they are attempting to flee the country. At the airport, Davey pretends that they are his parents who are abandoning him. When security intervenes, Davey tells the guard the proof is the game cartridge he knows they have. Cornered, the couple kidnap Davey and commandeer a plane, unaware that Davey has brought the bomb which the spies had planned to use to kill Kim. The spies request a pilot, and Hal, who has arrived at the airport with Kim's mother, volunteers to be the pilot. As the plane moves to the runway, Davey tries to summon Jack for help; his father hears him and identifies himself as "Jack Flack" and calls Davey to the cockpit. When the female enforcer prepares to escort him, she discovers the bomb and panics, calling for her husband.  Hal gets Davey out of the plane through the cockpit window. Davey runs after the plane down the runway, calling for his father, until the plane explodes, destroying the cartridge and the enforcers in the process. Then a figure appears and approaches him, looking like the silhouette of Jack Flack before revealing that he is his father. As the two embrace, Davey asks how he was able to escape, and Hal replies, "Jack Flack always escapes".

Davey, joyful that his father is alive, realizes that his father is his true hero and has moved on from Jack. He proudly replies to Hal, "I don't need him anymore. I got you, Dad".

Cast

Production
Henry Thomas said the film is "pretty exciting ... It's got some violence in it. I get to fire a gun".

Principal photography went from August 8 to October 7, 1983. Filming took place in San Antonio, Texas, chosen because it was Thomas's hometown. The Alamo exterior was filmed on location, but they were not allowed to film inside, so they recreated the interior.

In a 2012 interview, Coleman recalled:

Video game
Critical to the movie's plot is an Atari video game called Cloak & Dagger made for the Atari 5200. The arcade version appears in the movie; the Atari 5200 version was started but never completed. The game was under development with the title Agent X when the movie producers and Atari learned of each other's projects and decided to cooperate. This collaboration was part of a larger phenomenon, of films featuring video games as critical plot elements (as with Tron and The Last Starfighter) and of video game tie-ins to the same films (as with the Tron games for the Intellivision and other platforms).

Reception
The film was released during the 1984 Summer Olympics. Universal said that the target audience of younger children would not be as interested in Olympics and the film would have less competition. The film grossed $9.7 million in the United States, $2.8 million of which came from its opening weekend.

Cloak & Dagger received a 67% approval rating on Rotten Tomatoes based on 12 reviews, with an average rating of 5.8/10. On her review, Janet Maslin of The New York Times praised Franklin's direction, as well as the performances of Thomas and Coleman. Metacritic gave the film a score of 64 based on 7 reviews, indicating "generally favorable reviews".

Neil Gaiman reviewed Cloak & Dagger for Imagine magazine, and stated that "director Richard Franklin's fascination with Alfred Hitchcock continues; and echoes, lines and themes of Hitchcock films crop up all through this engaging and enjoyable film".

The 1996 movie guide "Seen That, Now What?", the film was given the rating of "B+", stating "Tight script, quick pace and light but not moronic tone makes this the rare entry that can be responsibly called family fare".

Other adaptations
The Woolrich's story has been adapted three more times:
 The Window (1949)
 The Boy Cried Murder (1966)
 Eyewitness (1970)

References

External links

FAQ about the Atari 5200 version of Cloak & Dagger, including discussion of the film tie-in.

1984 films
1980s action thriller films
1980s mystery films
1980s spy films
1980s crime thriller films
American action thriller films
American crime thriller films
American mystery films
American spy films
1980s English-language films
Universal Pictures films
Films directed by Richard Franklin (director)
Films about computing
Films about video games
Films set in San Antonio
Films shot in Los Angeles
Films shot in San Antonio
Films produced by Allan Carr
Films scored by Brian May (composer)
Films based on works by Cornell Woolrich
Films based on short fiction
1980s American films